HNP may refer to:

National parks 
 Hargeisa National Park in Somalia
 Hustai National Park, in Mongolia

Other uses 
 Haranpur Junction railway station, in Pakistan
 Herenigde Nasionale Party, a defunct South African political party
 Herstigte Nasionale Party, a South African political party
 Hindeloopen railway station, in the Netherlands
 Host Negotiation Protocol, in the USB On-The-Go standard
 Huaneng Power International, a Chinese power company
 Hugpong ng Pagbabago, a political alliance in the Philippines
 Human neutrophil peptides or alpha defensins 1-4